Mazatán Municipality is a municipality in Sonora in north-western Mexico.

Area and population
The municipal area is 649.27 km2 with a population of 4,187 registered in 2000.  The municipal seat had a population of 1,499 in 2000.  It is located at an elevation of 450 meters.

Neighboring municipalities
Neighboring municipalities are Ures Municipality, Villa Pesqueira Municipality, La Colorada Municipality, and Hermosillo Municipality.

References

Municipalities of Sonora